Call My Life is the debut studio album by American drag queen and singer Blair St. Clair, released in June 2018. She is the first queen from RuPaul's Drag Race to have a debut album top one of the Billboard charts.

Promotion
Music videos were created for "Now or Never" and "Call My Life". The former video was directed by Shawn Adeli and Brad Hammer, and features appearances by Max Emerson, Jinkx Monsoon, and Manila Luzon. The music video for "Call My Life" features drag queens Eureka, Jujubee, Manila Luzon, Mayhem Miller, and Pandora Boxx.

Track listing
Track listing adapted from the iTunes Store.

Charts

Call My Life: Remixed

Call My Life: Remixed is a remix album by American drag queen Blair St. Clair as a companion to her debut studio album Call My Life on August 10, 2018. It consists entirely of remixes of the album's title track.

Track listing

References

2018 debut albums
Blair St. Clair albums
Electronic albums by American artists
Producer Entertainment Group albums